Bryan Blundell (c. 1675–1756) was an English merchant involved in the transatlantic slave trade. Blundell captained The Mulberry, which transported a large number of indentured workers to Virginia and was the first ship in the Old Dock in Liverpool in 1715. Blundell is also noted for his foundation of The Liverpool Blue Coat Hospital School in 1708 with the Rector of Liverpool, the Reverend Robert Stythe, to provide an education for the city's destitute children and orphans. Blundell captured many slaves stating that " I went for 200 and came back with 400".

Blundell was known as a Master mariner. He first went to sea aged 12 and kept a detailed journal painting a vivid picture of the tumultuous political times and their impact on transatlantic trade. This document also contains his amateur colour drawings of ships and detailed drafts of their rigging plans, which enabled him to have vessels constructed in Virginia at a far lower cost than in England.

Blundell was heavily involved in the trade and transportation of African slaves. For example, he was the sole owner of the slave ship Tarleton which landed 236 of its 273 slaves in Barbados having embarked them on the Gold Coast. It is presumed that the remaining 37 enslaved people did not survive this journey. Blundell's sons and descendants continued to build wealth from the transatlantic slave trade throughout the 18th century.

Blundell served as Mayor of Liverpool between 1721 and 1722 and again between 1728 and 1729; a position also held by his son Henry Blundell and his grandson Henry Blundell-Hollinshead.

Life and foundation of The Liverpool Blue Coat Hospital School 
Both Blundell and Robert Stythe were members of the Society for Promoting Christian Knowledge and in line with the organisation's mission in England they founded The Liverpool Blue Coat Hospital School in 1708. 50 boys were admitted to the school in its first year and a school building (now the Bluecoat Chambers) was dedicated in 1717 to provide boarding facilities for the growing number of students, toward which Blundell gave £500.

After Robert Stythe's death in 1714 Blundell was appointed as treasurer of the school, an appointment he held for 42 years until his own death in 1756. Upon gaining this position Blundell resigned himself from the sea, though he continued to operate as a merchant and slave trader. Blundell expressed a desire in his accounts to 'see as many charity schools as there are churches' as well as to see 100 boys and girls in the Blue Coat before his death - a desire which was indeed accomplished.

Blundell died on 27 January 1756 and was interred at Our Lady and St Nicholas Church. His sons succeeded him as treasurers of the Blue Coat. His memorial stone, originally housed in Our Lady and St Nicholas Church, now resides in the chapel of The Liverpool Blue Coat School after the church was damaged during the Liverpool Blitz.

References

Mayors of Liverpool
English slave traders
English philanthropists
1756 deaths
Year of birth uncertain
18th-century English businesspeople